Katherine "Kate" J. Boo (born August 12, 1964) is an American investigative journalist who has documented the lives of people in poverty. She has won the MacArthur "genius" award (2002) and the National Book Award for Nonfiction (2012), and her work earned the 2000 Pulitzer Prize for Public Service for The Washington Post. She has been a staff writer for The New Yorker magazine since 2003. Her book Behind the Beautiful Forevers: Life, Death and Hope in a Mumbai Undercity won nonfiction prizes from PEN, the Los Angeles Times Book Awards, the New York Public Library, and the American Academy of Arts and Letters, in addition to the National Book Award for Nonfiction.

Life
Boo grew up in and near Washington, D.C., and attended the College of William and Mary for two years and transferred to Barnard and then graduated summa cum laude from Barnard College of Columbia University. She is married to Sunil Khilnani, a professor of politics and history at Ashoka University, India.

Career
Boo began her career in journalism with writing and editing positions at Washington's City Paper and then the Washington Monthly. From there she went to The Washington Post, where she worked from 1993 to 2003, first as an editor of the Outlook section and then as an investigative reporter.

In 2000, The Washington Post received the Pulitzer Prize for Public Service for Boo's 1999 series about group homes for intellectually disabled people. The Pulitzer judges noted that her work "disclosed wretched neglect and abuse in the city's group homes for the intellectually disabled, which forced officials to acknowledge the conditions and begin reforms."

In 2003, she joined the staff of The New Yorker, to which she had been contributing since 2001.
One of her subsequent New Yorker articles, "The Marriage Cure," won the National Magazine Award for Feature Writing in 2004. The article chronicled state-sponsored efforts to teach poor people in an Oklahoma community about marriage in hopes that such classes would help their students avoid or escape poverty.

Another of Boo's New Yorker articles, "After Welfare", won the 2002 Sidney Hillman Award, which honors articles that advance the cause of social justice.

In 2002, Boo was a senior fellow at the New America Foundation. She won a MacArthur Fellowship in 2002. She was also a fellow of the Wissenschaftskolleg zu Berlin in 2010.

In 2012, Random House published Boo's first book, Behind the Beautiful Forevers: Life, Death and Hope in a Mumbai Undercity, a non-fiction account of life in the Annawadi slums of Mumbai, India. It won the annual National Book Award for Nonfiction on November 14, 2012.

In 2022 and 2023, Boo served as a judge for the American Mosaic Journalism Prize.

Awards 
2000 Pulitzer Prize for Public Service, The Washington Post, "notably for the work of Katherine Boo"
2002 MacArthur Fellowship
2002 The Hillman Prize
2004 National Magazine Award for Feature Writing
2012 Samuel Johnson Prize, shortlist, Behind the Beautiful Forevers
2012 National Book Award (Nonfiction), Behind the Beautiful Forevers
2012 Columbia Journalism Award
2013 PEN/John Kenneth Galbraith Award, Behind the Beautiful Forevers

Books 
 Behind the Beautiful Forevers: Life, Death and Hope in a Mumbai Undercity. New York City: Random House (February 7, 2012).

References

External links

"The Craft of Writing: Katherine Boo", NPR, JENNIFER LUDDEN, October 16, 2004
"Katherine Boo: Reporting Across the Income Gap", Nieman Conference on Narrative Journalism
"Boo's Clues", slate, Mickey Kaus, May 18, 2001
Behind the Beautiful Forevers: Book's website
NPR-Fresh Air Interview Feb. 8, 2012
 

1964 births
Living people
The New Yorker staff writers
MacArthur Fellows
The Washington Post journalists
Barnard College alumni
Journalists from Washington, D.C.
Radical centrist writers
21st-century American non-fiction writers
21st-century American women writers
Place of birth missing (living people)
New America (organization)